Carl Jensen (December 19, 1909 – March 18, 1991) was a Danish boxer who competed in the 1932 Summer Olympics. He was born in Aarhus and died in Gentofte.

In 1932 he was eliminated in the quarter-finals of the welterweight class after losing his fight to the upcoming silver medalist Erich Campe.

References

1909 births
1991 deaths
Sportspeople from Aarhus
Welterweight boxers
Olympic boxers of Denmark
Boxers at the 1932 Summer Olympics
Danish male boxers